Get a life or Get a Life may refer to:

 Get a life (idiom), an idiom and catchphrase usually intended as a taunt

Film and television 
Get a Life (film), a 2001 Portuguese film
Get a Life, a 2006 film by Toby Ross
Get a Life (American TV series), a 1990–1992 American sitcom starring Chris Elliott
Get a Life (British TV series), a 2007 British makeover programme hosted by Jodie Marsh
Get a Life!, a 2012 documentary about Star Trek fandom starring William Shatner

Literature 
 Get a Life (novel), a 2005 novel by Nadine Gordimer
 Get a Life!, a 1995 book by Wayne Roberts
 Get a Life!, a 1999 book by William Shatner about Star Trek fandom

Music

Albums
 Get a Life (Doug Sahm album) or the title song, 1998
 Get a Life (Stiff Little Fingers album) or the title song, 1994
 Get a Life (Vice Squad album) or the title song, 1999

Songs
 "Get a Life" (Soul II Soul song), 1989
 "Get a Life", by Built to Spill from Ultimate Alternative Wavers, 1993
 "Get a Life", by FireHouse from 3, 1995
 "Get a Life", by the Freestylers from Raw as Fuck, 2004
 "Get-A-Life", by Gorefest from False, 1992
 "Get a Life", by Julian Lennon from Help Yourself, 1991
 "Get a Life", by Lil Wayne from Rebirth, 2010
 "Get a Life", by Limp Bizkit from Gold Cobra, 2011
 "La teva decisió (Get a Life)", a song by Susanne Georgi, representing Andorra at Eurovision 2009

Other media 
 Get a Life, a comic strip on the GoComics web site

See also 
 "Get a Life – Get Alive", a song by Eric Papilaya